"A Ti" is a song written by the Guatemalan singer-songwriter Ricardo Arjona for his tenth studio album, Adentro (2005). It was the fourth single released from the album in 2006 and was later included on Arjona's compilation album, Quién Dijo Ayer (2007), alongside a reworked version with the Italian singer Eros Ramazzotti.

Trackslisting 
Album version
"A Ti" — 4:50

Credits and personnel
Producer - Carlos Cabral "Junior", Dan Warner
Lead vocals - Ricardo Arjona
Songwriting - Ricardo Arjona

Charts

Weekly charts

Year-end charts

References 

Ricardo Arjona songs
Songs written by Ricardo Arjona
Sony BMG Norte singles
2005 songs